Dimitri Basilaia (born 27, November, 1985) is a Georgian rugby union player who plays for USA Perpignan in the Top 14.

Club career

Basilaia left Georgia and joined Clermont, playing in the Espoirs side. After being unable to break into the Clermont first team, he left for Fédérale 1 side Morlaàs in 2008. Basilaia went on to play for four clubs in Fédérale 1 in four seasons, with one season spells at Le Bugue, Aubenas and Valence d'Agen. After his performances for Georgia at the 2011 World Cup he was signed by Edinburgh in 2012 and he became the first ever Georgian to play in the Pro12. He joined Perpignan in May 2014.

International career

Basilaia made his debut for Georgia in 2008, scoring a try against Portugal and becoming first choice for the ENC that year. However, after 2008, Basilaia lost his place in the Georgia side as Mamuka Gorgodze changed position from lock to number 8. Basilaia made limited appearances for Georgia, either as a sub or in weakened sides, for the next couple of years.

After not playing for 19 months, Basilaia returned to the Georgian side before the 2011 World Cup in the IRB Nations Cup in June, and made the Georgian World Cup squad. He was one of Georgia's most impressive players during the tournament, starting three matches and scoring a try against England.

Notes and references

1985 births
Living people
Edinburgh Rugby players
Rugby union players from Georgia (country)
Expatriate rugby union players from Georgia (country)
Expatriate rugby union players in Scotland
Expatriate rugby union players in France
Expatriate sportspeople from Georgia (country) in Scotland
Expatriate sportspeople from Georgia (country) in France
Georgia international rugby union players
Rugby union flankers
Rugby union players from Tbilisi